Franklin Bridge may refer to:
 Franklin Bridge (Nebraska) in Franklin County
 Franklin Bridge (band)
 Benjamin Franklin Bridge between Philadelphia and Camden

See also 
 Franklin Avenue Bridge in Minneapolis
 Franklin Street Bridge in Chicago